Jamie Fielding is the name of:

Jamie Fielding (footballer), English footballer
Jamie Fielding (musician), Australian musician